L. G. Wasantha Piyatissa is a Sri Lankan politician and a former member of the Parliament of Sri Lanka.

References

Year of birth missing (living people)
Living people
Members of the 13th Parliament of Sri Lanka
United People's Freedom Alliance politicians